The Waljen are an indigenous people of Western Australia, in the Goldfields-Esperance area.

Country
Their southeastern boundary was around Edjudina Soaks. They were also present around Lake Lightfoot and at Lake Carey. Their eastern extension lay beyond Lake Minigwal. In the latter context, their traditional lore also speaks of an important site, not identified, called Winbalj..

History
The Waljen seemed to have shifted southwestward towards the end of the 19th century, and by the 1890s they had reached the area south of Kalgoorlie.

Alternative name
 Koara.
 Wonggai-juŋara.('aggressive men/usurpers'), an exonym used of them by the Maduwongga and Kalamaia.

Notes

Citations

Sources

Aboriginal peoples of Western Australia
Goldfields-Esperance